Romi Paritzki (Hebrew: רומי פריצקי: born on 17 June 2004) is an Israeli rhythmic gymnast. She won the gold medal in the group All-Around at the 2022 European Championship and a silver medal in the same category at the 2022 World Championships.

Personal life 
She took up gymnastics at age eight in Netanya, Israel, after being introduced to it through a school project. She has two younger sisters,  Eleanor and Nela who are also rhythmic gymnasts. The girls' parents are professional classical dancers, who met the Israeli ballet troupe.

Career

Junior 
Paritzki was part of the national junior group for the 2019 European and World Championships, the group composed of Diana, Amit Hedvat, Emili Malka, Mishel Mialitz, Diana Svertsov won european silver with 5 ribbons, as well as world's team and 5 ribbons bronze.

Senior 
In 2022 Romi was named part of Israel's new national group, they debuted at the World Cup in Athens, winning gold in 5 hoops and 3 ribbons + 2 balls. Then Baku, where they got bronze in the All-Around and 5 hoops. Pamplona (All-Around silver), Portimão (All-Around gold) and Cluj-Napoca (All-Around and 5 hoops silver).

In June she participated in the European Championships in Tel Aviv, where the group won the All-Around and got silver with 5 hoops as well as the bronze medal in the senior team category along with teammates Shani Bakanov, Adar Friedmann, Amit Hedvat, Diana Svertsov, Ofir Shaham, and the individuals Daria Atamanov and Adi Asya Katz.

In September Romi took part in the World Championships in Sofia along Adar Friedmann, Diana Svertsov, Ofir Shaham and Shani Bakanov, winning two silver medals in the All-Around and the 5 hoops' final. Despite being among the favourites for a team medal, Israel couldn't take part in the competition because Atamanov broke her foot the day before the competition started and, as replacements had to be announced at least 24 hours before competition, leaving the country with only Katz as individual.

References 

2004 births
Living people
Israeli rhythmic gymnasts
Medalists at the Junior World Rhythmic Gymnastics Championships
Medalists at the Rhythmic Gymnastics European Championships
Medalists at the Rhythmic Gymnastics World Championships